Ray Collins (November 19, 1936 – December 24, 2012) was an American musician.

Early life
Collins grew up in Pomona, California singing in his school choir, the son of a local police officer. He quit high school to get married.

Career
Collins started his musical career singing falsetto backup vocals for various doo-wop groups in the Los Angeles area in the late 1950s and early 1960s, including Little Julian Herrera and the Tigers. In 1963 Collins co-wrote Memories of El Monte with Frank Zappa. In 1964, Collins, drummer Jimmy Carl Black, bassist Roy Estrada, saxophonist Dave Coronado, and guitarist Ray Hunt formed The Soul Giants.

Hunt was eventually replaced by Zappa, and the group evolved into the Mothers of Invention. Ray was the lead vocalist on most songs for their early albums, including Freak Out!, Absolutely Free, Cruising with Ruben & the Jets and Uncle Meat. He additionally provided harmonica on Freak Out!. In 1968 Ray quit The Mothers of Invention because of tension in the group, and was replaced by Lowell George, but continued to contribute to other Zappa projects through the mid-1970s.
After quitting the group and leaving behind his music career, Collins worked as a taxi driver for a few year's. Collins appeared in a few of Zappa's albums released after Zappa's death, []

 The Lost Episodes
 Joe's Corsage

Ray Collins description in freak out liner notes 
Moved into my recording studio, joined forces with Ray, Jim and Roy, schemed and plotted for a year, working in beer joints, blah, blah, starved a lot, etc... played a lot of freaky music & stayed vastly unpopular (though notorious). OWE OUR EXISTENCE to Mark Cheka for his initial encouragement and sterling example (and to a whole bunch of other people who are going to be bugged because their names aren't listed in detail, with addresses and pertinent facts about what they like about the government & their other fetishes). Ray used to be a carpenter and a bartender and sing with Little Julian Herrera & The Tigers (note the falsetto part in 'I REMEMBER LINDA')... been singing R&B for ten to twelve years. Jim got fired from some idiot band in Kansas, forcing him to move to California. Lucky for us. Seems he just couldn't get turned on playing " Louie, Louie" all night... it must have hurt him deeply when they rejected him. Roy is an asthmatic Pachuco, good-natured excellent bass player, involved in the R&B scene here for about ten years. He is unbelievably tolerant. I don't understand it. Elliot digs the blues. He has a big dimple in his chin. We made him grow beard to cover it up. He just got out of the Army. Lucky for the Army. THEY ARE ALL MUSICIANS. []

 Little Julian Herrera And The Tigers: I Remember Linda / True Fine Mama

(1957, 7", usa, starla records) - feat. Ray Collins on high falsetto backing

Personal life
Collins got married in 1953, Collins had a daughter who died in a plane crash at a young age.

Death
Collins resided in Claremont, California ending up living in a van in someone's back yard in Claremont, until he died of a heart attack on December 24, 2012, aged 76.

References

External links

American harmonica players
American rock singers
The Mothers of Invention members
1936 births
2012 deaths
People from Pomona, California
American male singers
Songwriters from California
Tambourine players